Beyond the Darklands is an Australian true crime television series that aired on the Seven Network. It was based on the New Zealand series of the same name and a book created by the New Zealand clinical psychologist Nigel Latta. The TVNZ series has been shown in Australia on the CI channel on Foxtel.

Overview 
The series was narrated by Samuel Johnson, with each episode focusing on a certain criminal (usually a murderer or team of murderers), with commentary from clinical psychologist Dr Leah Giarratano providing insight into the minds of the criminal(s).

After screening the first four episodes in early 2009, the show was taken off the air, only to return later that year for a further five episodes. Via a phone call on 11 November 2009, a Channel Seven spokesperson confirmed that the show was meant to be returning in the New Year with new episodes. Due to a court injunction, Channel Seven was prevented from screening the episode featuring Peter Dupas in Victoria.

Tagline
What turns a person into a monster? In this new, insightful documentary series, one of Australia's leading clinical psychologists, Leah Giarratano, explores the dark side of human behaviour as she delves into the minds of some of Australia's most notorious criminals. Interviews with those who knew them - family members, schoolmates and colleagues among them - reveal the lives and psychology of those who have committed shocking crimes.

Episodes

References

Seven Network original programming
2009 Australian television series debuts
2009 Australian television series endings
2000s Australian crime television series